Canada–Ukraine Free Trade Agreement (CUFTA, French: Accord de libre-échange Canada-Ukraine (ALECU), Ukrainian: Угода про вільну торгівлю між Україною та Канадою) is a free-trade agreement between Canada and Ukraine. According to the agreement, the signing parties eliminate custom duties on essentially all goods produced in one country and imported to the other.

History
On September 22, 2009, talks between Canada and Ukraine on a free trade agreement began, as announced by Minister of International Trade for Canada, Stockwell Day. Prime Minister of Ukraine Yulia Tymoshenko hoped for more effective cooperation with Canada once the trade deal were cemented. 

In July 2015 Prime Minister of Ukraine Arseniy Yatsenyuk announced with Canadian Prime Minister Steven Harper the successful conclusion of the Canada-Ukraine Free Trade Agreement.

The agreement was signed on 11 July 2016 in Kyiv, Ukraine, and has come into force on 1 August 2017. The signing ceremony took place in Kyiv and it was attended by Justin Trudeau (Prime Minister of Canada), Chrystia Freeland (Minister of International Trade of Canada), Petro Poroshenko (President of Ukraine), Volodymyr Groysman (Prime Minister of Ukraine), Stepan Kubiv (First Vice Prime Minister of Ukraine and Minister of Economic Development and Trade of Ukraine).

The ratification process of the agreement was concluded in June 2017, and the agreement has entered into force on 1 August 2017.

In early 2020 Canada started public consultations on possible modernization of the agreement. 

In January 2022 Canada and Ukraine announced starting the  new negotiations on modernizing the CUFTA agreement.

See also
 Canada–Ukraine relations
 Free-trade agreements of Canada

References

 
Ukraine
Treaties concluded in 2016
Treaties entered into force in 2017
Canada
2016 in Ukraine